Under the Riccione Sun is a 2020 Italian comedy-drama film directed by YouNuts!, written by Caterina Salvadori and Enrico Vanzina and starring Cristiano Caccamo, Ludovica Martino, Lorenzo Zurzolo and Isabella Ferrari. The film was released on 1 July 2020.

The film was followed by Under the Amalfi Sun, released on 13 July 2022.

Cast

References

External links
 
 

2020 films
2020s Italian-language films
2020 comedy-drama films
Italian comedy-drama films
Italian-language Netflix original films